The 1968 New Hampshire Wildcats football team was an American football team that represented the University of New Hampshire as a member of the Yankee Conference during the 1968 NCAA College Division football season. In its first year under head coach Jim Root, the team compiled a 6–2 record (4–1 against conference opponents) and tied for the Yankee Conference championship.

Schedule

References

New Hampshire
New Hampshire Wildcats football seasons
Yankee Conference football champion seasons
New Hampshire Wildcats football